Banman is a surname. Notable people with the surname include:

 Bruce Banman, Canadian politician
 Robert Banman (born 1945), Canadian politician

See also 
 Batman (surname)
 Barman (surname)
 Boatman (surname)

Russian Mennonite surnames